The Wakamiya Hachiman Shrine (若宮八幡社 Wakamiya Hachimansha) in Suehiro-chō, Sakae 3-chōme in the Naka ward of Nagoya is a historic Shinto shrine.

It dates back to the Taihō era (701-704). It was the main shrine of the Owari Tokugawa family.

The shrine was destroyed in the bombing of Nagoya in World War II, but rebuilt in 1957.

A large festival is held there every May.

References

External links 
 Official website

 

Beppyo shrines
Hachiman shrines
History of Nagoya
Sakae, Nagoya
Shinto shrines in Nagoya